The following outline is provided as an overview of and topical guide to Armenia:

Armenia – landlocked mountainous country, located at the crossroads of Eastern Europe and Western Asia, in the South Caucasus region of Eurasia. A former republic of the Soviet Union, Armenia is a unitary, multiparty, democratic nation-state with an ancient and historic cultural heritage.

General reference

 Pronunciation: 
 Common English country name:  Armenia
 Official English country name:  Republic of Armenia
 Common endonym(s):   Հայաստան (Hayastan)
 Official endonym(s):   Հայաստանի Հանրապետություն (Hayastani Hanrapetut’yun)
 Adjectival(s): Armenian
 Demonym(s): Armenian
 Etymology: Name of Armenia
 International rankings of Armenia
 ISO country codes: AM, ARM, 051
 ISO region codes: See ISO 3166-2:AM
 Internet country code top-level domain: .am

Geography of Armenia 

Geography of Armenia
 Armenia is a landlocked country
 Location:
 Northern Hemisphere and Eastern Hemisphere
 Eurasia
 Caucasus
 South Caucasus
 Europe
 Eastern Europe
 Caucasus
 South Caucasus
 Time zone
Armenia Time 
UTC+04:00

 Extreme points of Armenia
 High:  Mount Aragats 
 Low:  Debed 

 Population of Armenia: 3,231,900 – 134th most populous country

 Area of Armenia:  – 142nd largest country
 Atlas of Armenia

Neighbours of Armenia 
Land boundaries:  1,254 km
 787 km
 268 km
 164 km
 35 km
Coastline:  none

Environment of Armenia 

 Climate of Armenia
 Geology of Armenia
 Protected areas of Armenia
 National parks of Armenia
 Wildlife of Armenia
 Fauna of Armenia
 Birds of Armenia
 Mammals of Armenia

Natural geographic features of Armenia 

 Islands of Armenia
 Lakes of Armenia
 Mountains of Armenia
 Volcanoes in Armenia
 Rivers of Armenia
 World Heritage Sites in Armenia

Regions of Armenia 

Regions of Armenia

Ecoregions of Armenia 

List of ecoregions in Armenia
 Caucasus mixed forests

Administrative divisions of Armenia 

Administrative divisions of Armenia
 Provinces of Armenia
 List of Armenian provinces by Human Development Index

Provinces of Armenia 
Armenia is divided into ten provinces (sing. marz) and a special administrative division for the capital, Yerevan:
Yerevan
Shirak
Armavir
Lori
Ararat
Kotayk
Gegharkunik
Syunik
Aragatsotn
Tavush
Vayots Dzor

Cities of Armenia 

 Capital of Armenia: Yerevan
 Municipalities of Armenia
List of cities and towns in Armenia

Demography of Armenia 

Demographics of Armenia
 Census in Armenia
 Ethnic minorities in Armenia
 Assyrians in Armenia
 Greeks in Armenia
 Jews in Armenia
 Kurds in Armenia
 Russians in Armenia
 Ukrainians in Armenia
 Yazidis in Armenia
 Health in Armenia
 People of Armenia

Armenian Diaspora 

Armenian diaspora
Armenian population by country
Largest Armenian diaspora communities

Government and politics of Armenia 

 Form of government: unitary semi-presidential representative democratic republic
 Constitution of Armenia
 Elections in Armenia
 Central Electoral Commission of Armenia
Latest national elections: 2021 Armenian parliamentary election

Upcoming national elections: Next Armenian parliamentary election

Political parties in Armenia
Programs of political parties in Armenia

Branches of government

Government of Armenia

Executive branch of the government of Armenia 
 Head of state: President of Armenia, Vahagn Khachaturyan
 Head of government: Prime Minister of Armenia, Nikol Pashinyan
 Cabinet of Armenia

Legislative branch of the government of Armenia 
 National Assembly of Armenia

Judicial branch of the government of Armenia 
Judiciary of Armenia

Constitution of Armenia 
Constitution of Armenia
Constitutional Court of Armenia

Foreign relations of Armenia 

As of 2020, Armenia has established diplomatic relations with 172 separate entities.

Ministry of Foreign Affairs: Minister of Foreign Affairs, Ararat Mirzoyan

 Diplomatic missions in Armenia
 Diplomatic missions of Armenia
 List of ambassadors of Armenia
 List of Ministers of Foreign Affairs

Other:
 Armenia and the United Nations
 Armenia–BSEC relations
 Armenia–European Union relations
 Armenia-EU Comprehensive and Enhanced Partnership Agreement
 Armenia in the Council of Europe
 Armenia–NATO relations
 Armenia–OSCE relations
 Visa policy of Armenia
 Visa requirements for Armenian citizens
 Armenian passport

International organization membership 
Armenia is a member of the following international organizations and treaties:

Arab League (observer) 
Asian Development Bank (ADB)
Assembly of European Regions
Berne Convention on the Conservation of European Wildlife and Natural Habitats
Black Sea Trade and Development Bank
Bologna Process
British Council
Collective Security Treaty Organization (CSTO)
Commonwealth of Independent States (CIS)
Council of Europe (CoE)
Eastern Partnership
Energy Charter Treaty
Energy Community (observer)
Eurasian Customs Union
Eurasian Development Bank
Eurasian Union (EAEU) 
Eurocontrol
Euro-Atlantic Partnership Council (EAPC)
Euronest Parliamentary Assembly
European Athletic Association
European Atomic Energy Community (Cooperation agreement)
European Aviation Safety Agency (Pan-European Partner)
European Bank for Reconstruction and Development (EBRD)
European Broadcasting Union
European Civil Aviation Conference
European Charter for Regional or Minority Languages
European Committee for Standardization (Affiliate member)
European Common Aviation Area (Negotiating candidate)
European Convention for the Prevention of Torture
European Court of Human Rights and the European Convention on Human Rights
European Cultural Convention
European Higher Education Area
European Neighbourhood Policy
European Olympic Committees
European Organization for Nuclear Research (Cooperation agreement)
Federation of Euro-Asian Stock Exchanges
FIFA and UEFA
Food and Agriculture Organization (FAO)
General Confederation of Trade Unions (GCTU)
International Atomic Energy Agency (IAEA)
International Bank for Reconstruction and Development (IBRD)
International Civil Aviation Organization (ICAO)
International Criminal Court (ICCt) (signatory)
International Criminal Police Organization (Interpol)
International Development Association (IDA)
International Federation of Red Cross and Red Crescent Societies (IFRCS)
International Finance Corporation (IFC)
International Fund for Agricultural Development (IFAD)
International Labour Organization (ILO)
International Monetary Fund (IMF)
International Olympic Committee (IOC)
International Organization for Migration (IOM)
International Organization for Standardization (ISO)
International Red Cross and Red Crescent Movement (ICRM)
International Telecommunication Union (ITU)
International Telecommunications Satellite Organization (ITSO)
Interparliamentary Assembly on Orthodoxy
Inter-Parliamentary Union (IPU)
Multilateral Investment Guarantee Agency (MIGA)
Nonaligned Movement (NAM) (observer)
Organisation internationale de la Francophonie (OIF) 
Organization for Security and Cooperation in Europe (OSCE)
Organisation for the Prohibition of Chemical Weapons (OPCW)
Organization of American States (OAS) (observer)
Organization of the Black Sea Economic Cooperation (BSEC)
Pacific Alliance (observer)
Parliamentary Assembly of the Council of Europe
Partnership for Peace (PFP)
Shanghai Cooperation Organisation (dialogue partner)
Swiss Agency for Development and Cooperation
TRACECA
United Nations (UN)
United Nations Committee on the Peaceful Uses of Outer Space 
United Nations Conference on Trade and Development (UNCTAD)
United Nations Economic Commission for Europe
United Nations Educational, Scientific, and Cultural Organization (UNESCO)
United Nations Industrial Development Organization (UNIDO)
Universal Postal Union (UPU)
World Bank
World Customs Organization (WCO)
World Federation of Trade Unions (WFTU)
World Health Organization (WHO)
World Intellectual Property Organization (WIPO)
World Meteorological Organization (WMO)
World Tourism Organization (UNWTO)
World Trade Organization (WTO)

Law and order in Armenia 

Law of Armenia
 Capital punishment in Armenia
 Crime in Armenia
 Armenian mafia
 Corruption in Armenia
 Law enforcement in Armenia
 Prosecutor General of Armenia

Social issues in Armenia
 Human rights in Armenia
 LGBT rights in Armenia
 Recognition of same-sex unions in Armenia
 Freedom of religion in Armenia
 Pensions in Armenia
 Social protection in Armenia
 Tobacco Policy in Armenia
 Cannabis in Armenia

Military of Armenia 

Military of Armenia
 Command
 Commander-in-chief:
 Ministry of Defence of Armenia
 Forces
 Air Force of Armenia
 Army of Armenia
 List of equipment of the Armenian Armed Forces
 Navy of Armenia: None
 Military history of Armenia
List of wars involving Armenia
 Military ranks of Armenia
 National Security Service of Armenia

Local government in Armenia 

Local government in Armenia

History of Armenia 

History of Armenia

Prehistoric Armenia
Urartu
Orontid Dynasty
Artaxiad Dynasty
Roman Armenia
Arsacid dynasty of Armenia
Persian Armenia
Medieval Armenia
Arminiya
Armenian Kingdom of Cilicia
Russian Armenia
Ottoman Armenia
Armenian genocide
Armenian genocide recognition
First Republic of Armenia
Armenian SSR
Armenia

Culture of Armenia 
Culture of Armenia
 Architecture of Armenia
 Cuisine of Armenia
Beer in Armenia

 Languages of Armenia
Armenian Sign Language
 List of museums in Armenia
 Media in Armenia
Armenian newspapers
Media freedom in Armenia
Public Radio of Armenia
Telecommunications in Armenia
 Television in Armenia
 National symbols of Armenia
 Armenian Cross
Khachkar
 Armenian eternity sign
 Coat of arms of Armenia
 Flag of Armenia
 National anthem of Armenia
 Public holidays in Armenia
 World Heritage Sites in Armenia

Art in Armenia 
 Armenian art
Cafesjian Museum of Art
National Gallery of Armenia
 Armenian dance
 Armenian illuminated manuscripts
 Cinema of Armenia
Armenian National Cinematheque
 Literature of Armenia
 Music of Armenia
 Armenia in the Eurovision Song Contest
 Armenian jazz
 Armenian opera
Yerevan Opera Theatre
 Armenian Philharmonic Orchestra
 Armenian rock
 Theater of Armenia

Religion in Armenia 

Religion in Armenia
 Baháʼí Faith in Armenia
 Christianity in Armenia
Armenian Apostolic Church
Armenian Catholic Church 
Armenian Evangelical Church
Armenian Brotherhood Church
 Hinduism in Armenia
 Islam in Armenia
 Judaism in Armenia
 Neopaganism in Armenia
 Zoroastrianism in Armenia

Sports in Armenia 

Sports in Armenia
Armenia at the Olympics
Armenian Olympic Committee
List of Armenian Olympic medalists
Armenian Athletic Federation
Armenian Automobile Federation
Armenia at the Paralympics
Armenian Paralympic Committee
Armenian National Disabled Sports Federation
Armenian Basketball Federation
Armenia national basketball team
Armenian Baseball Federation
Armenia national baseball team
Armenian Biathlon Federation
Armenian National Federation of Bodybuilding
Armenian Boxing Federation
Armenian Darts Federation
Armenian Diving Federation
Armenian Fencing Federation
Armenian Gymnastics Federation
Armenian Handball Federation
Armenian national ice hockey team
Armenian National Rowing and Canoe Federation
Armenian National Squash Federation
Armenian Powerlifting Federation
Armenian Sailing Federation
Armenian Shooting Federation
Armenian Ski Federation
Armenian Snooker And Pocket Billiards Federation
Armenian Student Sports Federation
Armenian Swimming Federation
Armenian Synchronized Swimming Federation
List of Armenian records in swimming
Armenian Table Soccer Federation
Armenian Table Tennis Federation
Armenian Taekwondo Federation
Armenian Triathlon Federation
Armwrestling Federation of Armenia
Badminton Federation of Armenia
Boxing in Armenia
Checkers Federation of Armenia
Chess Federation of Armenia
Equestrian Federation of Armenia
Figure Skating Federation of Armenia
Football in Armenia
Armenia national football team
Armenia national under-21 football team
Armenian Premier League
Football Federation of Armenia
Golf Federation of Armenia
Grappling Federation of Armenia
Judo Federation of Armenia
Karate Federation of Armenia
Armenian Kyokushin Karate Federation
Armenian Shotokan Karate Federation
Mas-Wrestling Federation of Armenia
National Archery Federation of Armenia
National Federation of Modern Pentathlon of Armenia
National Kendo Federation of Armenia
Pan-Armenian Games
Rugby Federation of Armenia
Armenia national rugby union team
Sambo Federation of Armenia
Skateboarding Federation of Armenia
Tennis Federation of Armenia
Traditional Wushu Federation of Armenia
Volleyball Federation of Armenia
Water Polo Federation of Armenia
Weightlifting in Armenia
Armenian Weightlifting Federation
Wrestling in Armenia
Wrestling Federation of Armenia

Economy and infrastructure of Armenia 

Economy of Armenia
 Economic rank, by nominal GDP (2007): 121st (one hundred and twenty first)
 Agriculture in Armenia
 Banking in Armenia
 Armenia Securities Exchange
 Central Bank of Armenia
 Central Depository of Armenia
 List of banks in Armenia
 Communications in Armenia
 Internet in Armenia
 Companies of Armenia
 ArmCosmos
 HayPost
Currency of Armenia: Dram
ISO 4217: AMD
 Energy in Armenia
 Armenian Nuclear Power Plant
 Electricity sector in Armenia
 Ministry of Energy Infrastructures and Natural Resources (Armenia)
 Renewable energy in Armenia
 Solar power in Armenia
 Geographical issues in Armenia
 Mining in Armenia
 Taxation in Armenia
 Armenian Customs Service
 Armenian Tax Service
 Tourism in Armenia
 List of World Heritage Sites in Armenia
 Paragliding in Armenia
 Visa policy of Armenia

 Transport in Armenia
 Airports in Armenia
 List of airlines of Armenia
 List of the busiest airports in Armenia 
 Rail transport in Armenia
 Armenian Railways
 Railway stations in Armenia
 South Caucasus Railway
 Yerevan Metro
 Roads in Armenia

Education in Armenia 

Education in Armenia
 universities
 American University of Armenia
 Armenian State University of Economics
 Eurasia International University
 European University of Armenia 
 Fondation Université Française en Arménie
 National Polytechnic University of Armenia
 National University of Architecture and Construction of Armenia
 Russian-Armenian University
 State Academy of Fine Arts of Armenia
 Yerevan State Medical University
 Yerevan State University
 schools
 Ayb school
 Children of Armenia Fund
 Tumo 
 Armenian-language schools outside Armenia

See also 

Armenia

Index of Armenia-related articles
List of Armenia-related topics
List of international rankings
Member states of the Council of Europe
Member states of the Eurasian Economic Union
Member state of the United Nations
Outline of Europe
Outline of geography
Outline of the Republic of Artsakh

References

External links

Armenia
Armenia